Ali Rahnama (born 21 May 1985) is an Iranian professional futsal player. He is currently a member of Safir Gofteman in the Iranian Futsal Super League.

Honours

Country 
 AFC Futsal Championship
 Champion (1): 2010
 Confederations Cup
 Champion (1): 2009

Club 
 AFC Futsal Club Championship
 Runners-up (1): 2011 (Shahid Mansouri)
 Iranian Futsal Super League
 Champion (2): 2010–11 (Shahid Mansouri) - 2011–12 (Shahid Mansouri)
 Runners-up (2): 2008–09 (Eram Kish) - 2009–10 (Shahid Mansouri)
 Iran Futsal's 2nd Division
 Champion (1): 2007 (Saveh Shen)

Individual

International goals

References

External links 
 
 
 

1985 births
Living people
People from Behshahr
Sportspeople from Mazandaran province
Iranian men's futsal players
Futsal forwards
Almas Shahr Qom FSC players
Shahid Mansouri FSC players
Misagh FSC players
Shahrdari Saveh FSC players
Shahrvand Sari FSC players
21st-century Iranian people